A bicycle map or bike map is a map designed specifically for bicyclists. Bike maps often include features not on general purpose street maps such as bike lanes, bike paths, bike routes, bike shops, topographical features like major hills, etc. Earlier in the 20th century, bike maps tended to focus on showing pavement quality.

History 
The invention of the safety bicycle brought about the first bike boom in the late 19th century. Street maps available prior to this time period showed roads, but often emphasized railway lines and often did not give cyclists information of particular relevance to their mode of travel, e.g. pavement quality, hills, etc. Most bike maps of this period emphasise pavement quality, and served a dual role. On one hand they advised cyclists about roads good for cycling, and on the other they directly if implicitly criticized the agencies responsible for the maintenance of public roads as part of an organized campaign to improve pavements. Many of these maps, in America at least, were produced by a single organization, the League of American Wheelmen.

Early bicycling maps were made by drawing bicycling routes following mule and foot paths. In the early 20th century, the motorcar quickly supplanted most travel by bicycle and bike maps, like the bicycle itself largely stagnated for several decades.

The 1970s bike boom led to the creation once again of cycling maps for the general public, but in the meantime, the nature of most cycling trips had shifted rather dramatically as cities were being reorganized around cars. Many maps of this period emphasised the recreational dimension of cycling, highlighting recreational routes and a limited range of off-street trails.

Today, many cities or local advocacy groups produce bicycle maps. Often this still takes the form of a full-size paper map, but increasingly, people seem to be relying on online maps and automatic wayfinding applications. Numerous such applications have been developed around the needs and interests of cyclists.

Bike routing webmaps 

A great variety of web-based route planning tools have been developed in the last couple of decades. In recent years, these have become increasingly multi-modal in nature, offering directions for cyclists, pedestrians, transit users, etc. Routing instructions for cyclists are now included in major web map services such as Google Maps, and OpenStreetMap, but not in other major competitors such as Bing maps, Apple Maps, etc.

Web-based mapping efforts have often been hampered by the lack of detailed data on street conditions of interest to cyclists, and even of basic infrastructure like bikeways and lanes. One very promising development in this area is the rapid growth of OpenStreetMap. Many of the first OpenStreetMap contributors were avid cyclists and OpenStreetMap now offers some of the most detailed data on bike routes and bike infrastructure in much of the world. Open-source tools like OpenTripPlanner and the Open Source Routing Machine have developed fairly advanced routing algorithms that can make use of OpenStreetMap data to offer turn by turn directions for cyclists.

Bicycle suitability indices 
In the later half of the 20th century, urban planners and transportation engineers began to see a need to establishing suitability criteria indices specifically designed for bicyclists.  According to research done at the Texas Department of Transportation, two main areas of criteria should be considered when developing maps to show bicycle routes: Stress level criteria are based upon vehicle speed and volume of the curb lane (such as a wide outside lane).  Roadway conditions, also called BLOS or Bicycle Level of Service, consider variables dealing with speed limit, pavement condition, and location factors.

See also
Bicycle transportation planning and engineering
 Street map
 Transit map

References

Navigation maps